Padagha is a census town in Thane district in the Indian state of Maharashtra.

Demographics
 India census, Padagha had a population of 5056. Males constitute 52% of the population and females 48%. Padagha has an average literacy rate of 79%, higher than the national average of 59.5%: male literacy is 82%, and female literacy is 75%. In Padagha, 12% of the population is under 6 years of age.

References

Cities and towns in Thane district